Powerlifting at the 1992 Summer Paralympics consisted of ten events for men.

Medal summary

Medal table

References 

 

 
1992 Summer Paralympics events
Paralympics